Samia (Saamia) is a Bantu language spoken by the Luhya people of Uganda and Kenya. Ethnologue includes Songa as a dialect, but it may be a separate language.

See also
 Luhya language

References

Languages of Kenya
Languages of Uganda
Luhya language